National Highway 76 or NH 76 is a National Highway in India that links Allahabad in Uttar Pradesh with Pindwara in Rajasthan. This  highway passes through Udaipur, Kota, Shivpuri, Jhansi and Banda. 

National Highways Development Project
Approximately  stretch of NH 76 between Udaipur and Chittaurgarh has been selected as a part of the Golden Quadrilateral by the National Highways Development Project.
Approximately  stretch of NH 76 between Pindwara and Jhansi has been selected as a part of the East-West Corridor by the National Highways Development Project.

National Highway 76 Extension

It is called NH 76 Extn., route being  of NH 76 to Mirzapur. Some of the road passes through small hills.
An important point to note while travelling via this Highway is that traffic is very sparse (specially between Udaipur-Shivpuri) and you do not find any motels or roadside dhabas.

See also
 List of National Highways in India (by Highway Number)
 National Highways Development Project

External links
 Map of NH 76

References

76
76
76
76
76
National highways in India (old numbering)
Transport in Allahabad district